The 2021–22 Belgian National Division 1 was the sixth season of the third-tier football league in Belgium. With the previous season canceled in January 2021 after just a handful of matches played, the decision was made that no teams would be promoted or relegated, meaning that the same teams are taking part this season. The only exception is Roeselare, which defaulted and ceased to exist, making this a season with only 15 teams. Dender EH became champions on 25 May 2022 after winning their final match of the Promotion play-offs at home to Dessel, while their only remaining opponent RFC Liège, lost away to Knokke.

Team information

Team changes
Only Roeselare disappeared with respect to the previous season as it ceased to exist.

Regular season

League table

Results

Promotion play-offs
The teams finishing in the top four positions entered the promotion play-offs. The points obtained during the regular season were halved (and rounded up) before the start of the playoff, as a result, RFC Liège started with 25 points, Knokke and Dessel with 24 points, and Dender EH with 23 points. As all teams had finished the regular season on an even number of points, no rounding occurred. Going into the playoffs, only Dender EH and RFC Liège had applied for a Belgian professional football license, meaning that only those two teams were eligible for promotion. With just one matchday to go and RFC Liège two points ahead of Dender EH, a ruling was made on an earlier complaint by the Belgian FA that RFC Liège had not put sufficient U21 players on the match sheet during their regular season match against Dender EH. THe result of that match was changed from a 3–0 home win to a 0–5 forfeit loss, causing the starting points of RFC Liège to be lowered by one to 24 and those of Dender EH increased by two to 25. Going into the final match, Dender EH was suddenly leading by one point instead of being down two. RFC Liège appealed this decision, but then lost the final match (while Dender EH won) before a ruling was made, meaning the outcome won't matter.

Number of teams by provinces

References

Belgian National Division 1
Bel
3